
Year 696 (DCXCVI) was a leap year starting on Saturday the (link will display the full calendar) of the Julian calendar. The denomination 696 for this year has been used since the early medieval period, when the Anno Domini calendar era became the prevalent method in Europe for naming years.

Events 
 By topic 

 Religion 

 St. Peter's Abbey is founded by Rupert, bishop of Worms, at Salzburg (modern Austria).

Births

Deaths 
 June 8 or 697 – Chlodulf, bishop of Metz (or 697)
 August 13 – Takechi, Japanese prince
 Domnall Donn, king of Dál Riata (Scotland)
 Vinayaditya, king of Chalukya (India)
 Woncheuk, Korean Buddhist monk (b. 613)

References